Fairytales is the debut studio album by the Belarusian-Norwegian artist Alexander Rybak. It was released in Norway and most of Europe on 29 May 2009, and in the UK on 15 June. Most of the songs on the album are written and/or composed by Rybak himself.

The first single of this album is Rybak's "Fairytale", the winning song from the Eurovision Song Contest 2009. His entry broke the previous record of 292 in the festival and achieved a total of 387 points. All the participating countries (naturally excluding Norway) voted for the song.

Rybak wrote English lyrics for one Russian and one Norwegian song, for the album. The chorus in the song "Abandoned" (track #7), uses music by Kirill Moltchanov, from the theme from the 1968 Russian film Доживем до понедельника (en. We'll Live Till Monday). The song "If You Were Gone" (track #6), is an English version of the Norwegian song "Vårsøg", with music by Henning Sommerro.

Critical reception 

On 27 May 2009 Norway's biggest newspaper Verdens Gang was the first to review the album giving it top score, 6 out of 6. "Alexander Rybak has not only become a star in no time, he deserves the status as well", the paper said. On the same day it was revealed that the album had been leaked illegally on the net. Norwegian newspaper Dagbladet was less enthused. "Rybak is seducing, but not entirely convincing" their critic stated, giving it 4 out of 6 points. Aftenposten gave it 5 out of 6 stars, calling Rybak "a complete artist." Swedish newspaper Aftonbladet, however, caused a stir by giving the record merely 1 star and hurling epithets like "violin hobbit" and "smurf hits" at the artist. TV2 in Norway gave the album 4 out of 6 stars, stating that Rybak was "no one-hit-wonder at all". NRK gave Rybak a good review saying that Rybak was "a good pop composer." Dagsavisen gave the record 5 points out of 6, exclaiming "the fairy tale continues!" The radio channel P4 Radio Hele Norge gave the album a rather poor review. Calling it a record for "13 year old girls and Eurovision enthusiasts" it got 2 stars. Bergensavisen was impressed by the record, especially by the album's "personal style", and gave it 5 stars.

Track listing

Bonus track

Bonus track

French edition

Russian edition bonus track

Russian winter edition
Fairytales – Зимняя сказка (en. Winter Fairytales)

Standard-Edition

Digipack-Edition

1. CD:
Same songs as Standard-Edition

2. DVD:

Personnel

Musicians
Alexander Rybak – lead vocals, violin, piano, strings. All string arrangements, song arrangements.
Amir Aly – acoustic guitar (track #5), guitar (#1, #6), bass (#1, No. 5, #6), programming (#1, #6)
Gunnar Flagstad – piano (#9)
Henrik Wikström – keyboards (#5), programming (#5)
Jorunn Hauge – background vocals (#2)
Kai Morten Berg – percussion (#4)
Karianne Kjærnes – background vocals (#2)
Kim Edward Bergseth – background vocals (#4, #7), guitar (#3, No. 4, #7), bass (#2, No. 3, #4, #7), programming (#2, No. 3, #4, #8)
Laila Samuels – background vocals (#7)
Mattis Lerbak – drums (#3)
Sylvie Loche – background vocals (French bonus track: "Fairytale")

Recording and production staff
Amir Aly – producer (track No. 1, #5, #6), mixing (#1, No. 5, #6)
Björn Engelmann Cutting Room Studios – mastering
Henrik Wikström – producer (#5), mixing (#5)
Kim Edward Bergseth – producer (#2, No. 3, #4, No. 7, #8)
Ulf Ø. W. Holand – mixing (#2, No. 3, #4, No. 7, #8)

Album artwork
Baard Lunde – photos
Guro Synes – artwork, design
Trond Kulterud – artwork, design

Charts

Certifications

Release history

References

2009 debut albums
EMI Records albums
Alexander Rybak albums